Garnett Kelly (July 23, 1924 – August 5, 2017) was an American politician who served in the Missouri House of Representatives from 1971 to 1985.

He died on August 5, 2017, in Springfield, Missouri at age 93.

References

1924 births
2017 deaths
Republican Party members of the Missouri House of Representatives